Uşak is an electoral district of the Grand National Assembly of Turkey. It elects 3 members of parliament (deputies) to represent the province of the same name for a four-year term by the D'Hondt method, a party-list proportional representation system.

Members 
A population review of every electoral district is conducted before each general election, which can lead to certain districts being granted a smaller or greater number of parliamentary seats. Tunceli has elected two members of parliament since 1961; previously, it elected three.

There are currently three sitting members of parliament representing Uşak: two from the governing Justice and Development Party (AK Party) and one from the main opposition Republican People's Party (CHP).

General elections

2011

June 2015

November 2015

2018

Presidential elections

2014

References 

Electoral districts of Turkey
Politics of Uşak Province